Great West Road may refer to:
A4 road (England) from London to Bath and Bristol
Golden Mile (Brentford), West London (part of the above)
Great West Road, Zambia

See also
Great Western Road (disambiguation)